A terp is an artificial dwelling mound created to provide safe ground during storm surges, high tides or flooding.

Terp or TERP may also refer to:

Places 
 De Terp metro station, a stop on the Rotterdam Metro
 Saravan, Armenia, formerly called Terp

Other uses
 Maryland Terrapins, known as the Terps, athletic teams
 Terp (music industry jargon) meaning "dance"
Terpsichore, a muse
 Telluride-mediated polymerization, a type of reversible-deactivation radical polymerization
 Terminal instrument procedures (TERPS), aviation instrument approach procedures
 Theoretical ex-rights price (TERP), a calculated price for shares after issue of new shares
 TERP system, a technology to facilitate choreographed movement without rehearsal, by Patrice M. Regnier
 TerraForm Power, a subsidiary of SunEdison, stock ticker TERP
 Terp the Terrible, a character in the 1951 book The Hidden Valley of Oz by L. Frank Baum
 , an independent music label 
 Military slang for language interpreters

See also
 Turp (disambiguation)
 Turps (disambiguation)
 Interpreter